Soul Food: The Series is an American drama series that aired Wednesday nights on Showtime from June 28, 2000, to May 26, 2004.  Developed for television by Felicia D. Henderson,  the series was an adaptation of George Tillman's 1997 drama film, Soul Food, which was based on his childhood experiences growing up in Wisconsin. Having aired for five seasons and 74 episodes, it was the first hit drama that featured an African-American cast in U.S. primetime television.

Premise
Soul Food follows the triumphs, struggles, and rivalries of the Josephs, a tight-knit African-American family living in Chicago, Illinois. The series picks up six months after the events in the 1997 film, starting with the birth of Bird and Lem's son Jeremiah, as the family tries to hold together after the death of the Joseph sisters' mother Josephine (Irma P. Hall, reprising her role in flashback sequences), usually referred to as Mama, Mother Joe, or Big Mama.

Episodes

Cast
 Rockmond Dunbar as Kenny Chadway
 Darrin Dewitt Henson as Lem Van Adams
 Aaron Meeks as Ahmad Chadway
 Nicole Ari Parker as Teri Joseph
 Malinda Williams as Tracy "Bird" Joseph Van Adams
 Vanessa Estelle Williams as Maxine Joseph Chadway
 Boris Kodjoe as Damon Carter (recurring season 1; regular seasons 2–4; guest season 5)

Response
Soul Food was one of the first long-running and successful dramatic series on television to feature a predominantly African-American cast. Short-lived series such as Under One Roof and City of Angels featured predominantly black casts but never gained recognition due to lack of ratings and viewership. The show dealt in topics of politics, homosexuality, racial discrimination, and certain forms of abuse (drug, domestic, and sexual). Because it aired on Showtime, there was use of mild profanity and partial nudity. Several episodes even served as launching pads for upcoming new music artists. Many known performers such as Gerald Levert, Montell Jordan, India Arie, Sunshine Anderson and Common have made guest appearances as well.

Popularity
The show received five NAACP Image Awards nominations for Outstanding Drama Series and won three consecutive times in 2002, 2003, and 2004. Also, a three-book series was launched in 2002.

The Soul Food cast was interviewed by comedian Mo'Nique about fan reaction to the series. The cast considered that fans of the show would approach them at different places, including the airport, and would talk to them about storylines that they enjoyed or disliked. Nicole Ari Parker commented on studio executives telling the cast and crew that they were not marketable overseas; yet, after the show ended, the series garnered a fanbase in France.

Syndication
In 2004, BET acquired the rights to air reruns of the series (in the United States).  The episodes have been edited to allow for commercials, and to meet FCC content standards for basic cable networks.  BET aired syndicated reruns of Soul Food for a long time, until it shifted the series to its sister network, BET J (now known as BET Her). On March 15, 2010, the principal cast members (except for Rockmond Dunbar), appeared together on the BET late-night talk show The Mo'Nique Show. TV One began airing reruns of the series in January 2012. Syndication rights are currently held by Aspire, which began airing reruns of the series in January 2016.

Home releases
On June 24, 2003, Showtime Entertainment/Paramount Pictures Home Entertainment released the first season of Soul Food: The Series on DVD, just two weeks after the series wrapped its fourth season.

After a long delay, the remaining four seasons were released in 2007 and 2008 by Paramount Pictures and CBS Home Entertainment (because of CBS acquiring the pre-2006 Viacom, including Showtime Networks).

While season one (billed as "the complete first season") runs in its uncut, complete form, the remaining other seasons did not, primarily due to music licensing issues, and some episodes being edited from their original versions, primarily due to expensive costing issues while trying to go back to their original, unedited versions.

International rights to the series are held by Fox, which has yet to release DVD sets in other territories.

^ The 20-episode DVD release of "Season 3" actually contains the 10 episodes in Season 3 and the 10 episodes in Season 4.

Awards and nominations

References

External links
 

2000s American drama television series
2000 American television series debuts
2004 American television series endings
Showtime (TV network) original programming
Serial drama television series
Live action television shows based on films
Television series by CBS Studios
Television series by 20th Century Fox Television
Television shows set in Chicago
Television shows filmed in Toronto
English-language television shows
2000s American black television series
American black television series